is a Japanese gravure idol, singer, actress, tarento and former member of the idol groups Nogizaka46 and Chimo. On February 14, 2019, Etō announced that she would be graduating from Nogizaka46, that her graduation concert would be held at Ryōgoku Kokugikan the following month, and that her official group activities would conclude at the end of March. In April 2019, she became a regular co-host for the CS Fuji TV ONE Professional Baseball News 2019 program. In October 2019, she married professional baseball player Sōsuke Genda. On January 29, 2022, she gave birth to a baby boy.

Discography

Singles

Chimo

Nogizaka46

Albums

Chimo

Nogizaka46

Filmography

Films

Television

Theater

Radio

Advertising

Video games

Internet

Bibliography

Photo albums

Magazine appearances

Manga

Novels

References

External links
 – Nogizaka46 Official Site 
 – Nogizaka46 Official Site (14 November 2011 – ) 
 – Ōita Idol Chimo Blog (4 April 2009 – 12 March 2011) 
 – GREE (1 August 2011 – 27 March 2012) 
 – 755 (1 November 2014 – ) 
AKpedia 

Japanese gravure idols
Japanese female models
Japanese television actresses
Japanese television personalities
Japanese women singers
J-pop singers
Nogizaka46 members
Musicians from Ōita Prefecture
1993 births
Living people